Leandro Domingos de Melo (born March 11, 1986 in Tubarão), known as Leandro Melo, is a Brazilian footballer who plays for América RN as midfielder.

Career statistics

References

External links

1986 births
Living people
Brazilian footballers
Association football midfielders
Campeonato Brasileiro Série B players
Campeonato Brasileiro Série C players
Campeonato Brasileiro Série D players
Clube Atlético Metropolitano players
Clube Esportivo Bento Gonçalves players
Clube Náutico Marcílio Dias players
Oeste Futebol Clube players
Esporte Clube Juventude players
Esporte Clube São Bento players
América Futebol Clube (RN) players